Shigeki Toyoshima (born March 5, 1971) is a Japanese former high jumper. He was a bronze medallist in his event at the 1998 Asian Games, sharing the position with Malaysia's Loo Kum Zee with a jump of 2.19 m. He cleared the same height at the 1991 Asian Athletics Championships to take the silver medal. He twice competed at the IAAF World Indoor Championships (1997 and 1999).

At national level, he won once at the Japan Championships in Athletics, taking the title with a jump of 2.24 m in 1998. He also won at the National Sports Festival of Japan in 1994 with that same height.

International competitions

National titles
Japan Championships in Athletics
High jump: 1998
National Sports Festival of Japan
High jump: 1994

See also
List of high jump national champions (men)
List of Asian Games medalists in athletics

References

1971 births
Living people
Japanese male high jumpers
Asian Games bronze medalists for Japan
Asian Games medalists in athletics (track and field)
Athletes (track and field) at the 1998 Asian Games
Medalists at the 1998 Asian Games
Japan Championships in Athletics winners